Peoria Unified School District #11 (PUSD) is a school district headquartered in the District Administration Center (DAC) in Glendale, Arizona. It provides both primary and secondary education for most of Peoria, some areas of Glendale and Youngtown, and a small area of Surprise, and numerous unincorporated areas of Maricopa County. The district has 44 schools.

Early history
Peoria Unified School District #11 began in 1889, covering .  During the first school year, the class size expanded from 5 to 15 students.

The following year the district opened with a class size of three students. Maricopa County was considering merging Peoria District #11 with Washington Elementary School District #6.  According to William Bartlett: One day early in July, Mr. Mann, stopped a covered wagon along Grand Avenue; the wagon had several children inside.  Mann discovered that the driver had 9 children and was heading to Phoenix or anywhere else that would provide employment, and told the driver "You have got a job right here".  Eight of the Bills children enrolled in Peoria School and District 11 survived.

In 1905, the first building was destroyed by fire; a bond election to build a new school passed by only one vote.  A controversy arose about how many rooms the new school should have; many residents claimed that Peoria would never need more than two rooms in a school.  A $3,200 two-room school was finally built on 83rd Avenue and Madison Street.

Recent history
Today, Peoria Unified School District contains 32 elementary schools, seven comprehensive high schools, an online school and a transitional high school. There are about 37,000 students in the district. Over the past twenty years, the district has built at least one school each year because of increased urban sprawl in Glendale and Peoria.

In January 2005, the Marshall Ranch Jazz Band, under the direction of Jill Mahoney, was selected to perform along with Joey Sellers at the International Association for Jazz Education in Long Beach, California.

In May 2007, the PUSD Governing Board voted to close all high school campuses during lunch entirely by taking away parental choice.  A number of other metro Phoenix districts have made similar changes recently.

The PUSD Governing Board instituted a closed campus for the 2006–2007 school year.  Despite a walkout, continuing rancor and conflict at the board meetings, and a petition signed by over 2600 parents and students, the governing board has stood firm on this, and students are now required to remain on campus during lunch time.  Despite the new policy appearing to be a reversal of a policy approved in the 2005-2006 year, which permitted juniors and seniors with C averages to leave with parental permission forms signed, district spokesman Jim Cummings said the new rules do not alter past policy. The closed campus policy has remained in high schools throughout the district in the 2007-2008 year, and is scheduled to continue.

In March 2009, Peoria's Superintendent announced that up to 900 teachers may lose their positions in the district. Only teachers who have worked in the district for at least two years are likely to be affected. In addition, teachers who are eligible for retirement or those who have previously retired and are working under contract may be next on the chopping block. "We are preparing for the worst, but hoping for the very best," said Dr. Denton Santarelli, the Peoria Unified School District superintendent.

Schools

List of elementary schools
 Alta Loma
 Apache
 Canyon
 Cheyenne
 Copperwood
 Cotton Boll
 Country Meadows
 Coyote Hills
 Desert Harbor
 Desert Palms
 Desert Valley
 Foothills
 Frontier
 Heritage
 Ira A. Murphy
 Kachina 
 Lake Pleasant
 Marshall Ranch
 Oakwood
 Oasis
 Parkridge
 Paseo Verde
 Peoria
 Pioneer
 Sahuaro Ranch
 Santa Fe
 Sky View
 Sun Valley
 Sundance
 Sunflower Center
 Sunset Heights
 Vistancia
 Zuni Hills

Other schools and assets
 Peoria Transition Center Website - Transition Center For Students With Disciplinarian Issues
 KNOW - Cable channel ran by the district in the cities of Glendale and Peoria. It displays classes, interviews, board meetings, and children's programming

References

External links

 

School districts established in 1889
Education in Peoria, Arizona
School districts in Maricopa County, Arizona
Education in Glendale, Arizona
1889 establishments in Arizona Territory